General James Willis Cantey (November 30, 1794 – August 20, 1860) was a brigadier general in the South Carolina Militia, and a member of the South Carolina Legislature.  He was born in Camden, South Carolina, to James Cantey and Martha Whitaker.  Cantey married Camilla Floride Richardson, the granddaughter of General Richard Richardson (general) and sister of Governor John Peter Richardson II, and they had nine children.

In 1813 Cantey served in Captain John Irwin's cavalry company in the Creek Indian hostilities. Cantey fought in the battles of Ottosee and Talassee.  He fought in close combat and was given commendations for his gallantry in battle.  Cantey was elected Sheriff of Camden District in 1833, and was elected Brigadier General of the 5th Brigade in 1834. 

In 1836 General Cantey recruited a company of mounted infantry for three months duty in the Second Seminole War.    In 1843 he was elected Adjutant and Inspector General of South Carolina and served in that position until 1853. He was also elected to two terms in the South Carolina Legislature in 1846 and again in 1848.

General Cantey's son-in-law was General Patrick Henry Nelson, Confederate States Army officer and militia General from South Carolina during the American Civil War.
General Cantey is the uncle of General James Cantey (1818–1874), Confederate States Army brigadier general during the American Civil War.

General Cantey's grandson, Patrick Henry Nelson II, founded The Nelson Law Firm, was a member of the South Carolina House of Representatives, and was the Fifth Circuit Solicitor and the president of the South Carolina Bar Association (1911–1912).

References
 

 1794 births
 1860 deaths
 People from Camden, South Carolina